State Route 168 (SR 168) is north–south state highway in the northeastern portion of the U.S. state of Ohio.  The southern terminus of State Route 168, which doubles as the southern endpoint of State Route 528, is along State Route 88 at a signalized intersection with U.S. Route 422 in the hamlet of Parkman.  State Route 168's northern terminus, which is concurrently the northern endpoint of State Route 700, is at the junction with State Route 87 at a traffic circle in Burton.

Route description

State Route 168 is located entirely within the southeastern quadrant of Geauga County.  The route is not included as a part of the National Highway System, a network of highways deemed most vital to the nation's economy, mobility and defense.

History
As it appeared when it was first designated in 1924, State Route 168 followed what is currently the portion of State Route 87 between State Route 168's current northern terminus in Burton and the State Route 45 in the unincorporated community of North Bloomfield, while State Route 87 was routed along the entirety of the current State Route 168 from Burton to Parkman.  Three years later, State Route 87 and State Route 168 swapped alignments, with State Route 87 being re-routed onto its current alignment east of Burton, and the State Route 168 designation being applied to its current routing.

Major intersections

References

168
Transportation in Geauga County, Ohio